Events in the year 1794 in Spain.

Incumbents
Monarch: Charles IV

Events
January 28 - Capture of Fort-Dauphin (1794)
April 29-May 1 - Second Battle of Boulou
July 23-August 1 - Battle of the Baztan Valley
August 13 - Battle of San Lorenzo de la Muga
October 15–17 - Battle of Orbaitzeta
November 17–20 - Battle of the Black Mountain

Deaths
November 20 - Luis Firmín de Carvajal, Conde de la Unión, Peruvian-born general, killed during the Siege of Roses (1794–95) (born 1752)

References

 
1790s in Spain